2019 AFF Invitational Futsal Club Championship was the fifth edition of AFF Futsal Club Championship. The tournament was held in Nakhon Ratchasima, Thailand from 18 to 23 June 2019. The title of the tournament was also changed into AFF Futsal Cup.  The defending champion was Bangkok BTS but they didn't take part in this edition.

Participants

Group A

Group B

Group stage 
All times are local, WIB (UTC+7).

Group A

Group B

Fifth-place match

Knockout stage

Bracket

Semi-finals

Third-place match

Final

Winner

Final standings

References 

AFF Futsal Club Championship
International futsal competitions hosted by Thailand
Sport in Nakhon Ratchasima province
AFF Futsal Club Championship
AFF Futsal Club Championship